Luiz Felipe Veloso Santos (born April 7, 1997), known as Lipe Veloso, is a Brazilian football player. He plays for Torpedo-BelAZ Zhodino.

Career
Lipe Veloso joined J1 League club FC Tokyo in 2017.

Club statistics
Updated to 22 February 2018.

References

External links
Profile at FC Tokyo

1997 births
Living people
People from Ribeirão Preto
Footballers from São Paulo (state)
Brazilian footballers
Association football midfielders
J1 League players
J3 League players
FC Tokyo players
FC Tokyo U-23 players
FC Lviv players
FC Torpedo-BelAZ Zhodino players
Riga FC players
Ukrainian Premier League players
Brazilian expatriate sportspeople in Japan
Expatriate footballers in Japan
Brazilian expatriate sportspeople in Ukraine
Expatriate footballers in Ukraine
Brazilian expatriate sportspeople in Belarus
Expatriate footballers in Belarus
Brazilian expatriate sportspeople in Latvia
Expatriate footballers in Latvia